Kenneth Wilfrid Bishop is a recipient of the Cross of Valour, Canada's highest civilian award for bravery.

His citation reads:

References

Recipients of the Cross of Valour (Canada)
Living people
Year of birth missing (living people)